The Ceira River is a river in central Portugal arising out of the Serra do Açor. It is a lefthand tributary of the Mondego River, which it enters from the south, just upstream of the city of Coimbra.

Course
The Ceira arises in the Covilhã Municipality and flows basically southwest through Pampilhosa da Serra Municipality until it enters Góis Municipality and flows west past its villages of Soito, Colmeal, Sobral, Candosa, Capelo, Sandinha, and Cabreira to Cortecega where it turns north past the villages of Carcavelos, Góis, Nogueiro, Várzea Pequena, and Vila Nova do Ceira. At Juncal, Góis Municipality, where it is joined from the left (south) by the Rio Sótão, the river again turns southwest towards Serpins after which it heads west past Casal de Ermio. Shortly after Casal de Ermio, the river heads northwest past the village of Foz de Arouce, where it is joined from the left (southwest) by the Rio Arouce.

National Highway 17 runs along the right bank of the river starting just west of Alçaperna and continuing all the way to the Mondego River, which it bridges into the town of Coimbra.

Features
In addition the reservoir is fed by water from the Castanheira Dam on the Arganil, via a  tunnel through the mountain.

Tributaries
 Rio Sótão
 Rio Arouce
 Rio Corvo, also known as the Rio Dueça

References

Further reading

External links
 
 

Rivers of Portugal